In the mathematical field of numerical analysis, spline interpolation is a form of interpolation where the interpolant is a special type of piecewise polynomial called a spline. That is, instead of fitting a single, high-degree polynomial to all of the values at once, spline interpolation fits low-degree polynomials to small subsets of the values, for example, fitting nine cubic polynomials between each of the pairs of ten points, instead of fitting a single degree-ten polynomial to all of them. Spline interpolation is often preferred over polynomial interpolation because the interpolation error can be made small even when using low-degree polynomials for the spline. Spline interpolation also avoids the problem of Runge's phenomenon, in which oscillation can occur between points when interpolating using high-degree polynomials.

Introduction

Originally, spline was a term for elastic rulers that were bent to pass through a number of predefined points, or knots. These were used to make technical drawings for shipbuilding and construction by hand, as illustrated in the figure.

We wish to model similar kinds of curves using a set of mathematical equations. Assume we have a sequence of  knots,  through . There will be a cubic polynomial  between each successive pair of knots  and  connecting to both of them, where .

The curvature of any curve  is defined as

 

Each successive polynomial must have equal values (which are equal to the y-value of the corresponding datapoint), derivatives, and second derivatives at their joining knots, which is to say that

 

This can only be achieved if polynomials of degree 3 (cubic polynomials) or higher are used. The classical approach is to use polynomials of exactly degree 3 — cubic splines.

In addition to the three conditions above, a 'natural cubic spline' has the condition that .

In addition to the three main conditions above, a 'clamped cubic spline' has the conditions that  and  where  is the derivative of the interpolated function.

Algorithm to find the interpolating cubic spline

We wish to find each polynomial  given the points  through . Or, more precisely,

 
 
 
 

The full equation  can be written in the symmetrical form

where

To derive these critical values, we must consider that

 
It then follows that

If now  are  points, and

for i = 1, ..., n, where

If the sequence  is such that, in addition,  holds for i = 1, ..., n − 1, then the resulting function will even have a continuous second derivative.

From,, and  follows that this is the case if and only if

for i = 1, ..., n − 1. The relations are  linear equations for the  values .

 
 
i.e. that

For the "not-a-knot" spline, the additional equations will read:

 
 

where .

Example

with
 
 
 
 
 
 
 
 
 
 

For the three points
 
one gets that
 
 
 
 
 

See also
Cubic Hermite spline
Centripetal Catmull–Rom spline
Discrete spline interpolation
Monotone cubic interpolation
NURBS
Multivariate interpolation
Polynomial interpolation
Smoothing spline
Spline wavelet
Thin plate spline
Polyharmonic spline

Computer code
TinySpline: Open source C-library for splines which implements cubic spline interpolation

SciPy Spline Interpolation: a Python package that implements interpolation

Cubic Interpolation: Open source C#-library for cubic spline interpolation

References

External links
 Cubic Spline Interpolation Online Calculation and Visualization Tool (with JavaScript source code)
 
 Dynamic cubic splines with JSXGraph
 Lectures on the theory and practice of spline interpolation
 Paper which explains step by step how cubic spline interpolation is done, but only for equidistant knots.
 Numerical Recipes in C, Go to Chapter 3 Section 3-3
 A note on cubic splines
 Information about spline interpolation (including code in Fortran 77)

Splines (mathematics)
Interpolation